Ottawa Municipal Airport  is in Ottawa, Kansas, United States, four miles south of Ottawa at 2178 Montana Road.

OThe airport opened in April 1946. It serves small business jets.

There are two buildings at the airport, and aircraft are stored outside. There is a tiedown hangar, likely replacing the old main hangar that was destroyed on July 8, 2009.

Besides the main runway, there is a grass runway (13/31).

External links 

Airports in Kansas
Buildings and structures in Franklin County, Kansas
Ottawa, Kansas